Highland Independent School District is a public school district in southwestern Nolan County, Texas (USA).

Academic achievement
In 2009, the school district was rated "exemplary" by the Texas Education Agency.
Received the 2015 National Blue Ribbon School Award, an award issued by the U.S. Secretary of Education for overall academic excellence or progress in closing achievement gaps.  Highland ISD was one of only 25 schools recognized in Texas.

Schools
The district has one campus that serves students in grades pre-kindergarten through twelve.

Special programs

Athletics
Highland High School plays six-man football.

See also

List of school districts in Texas

References

External links

School districts in Nolan County, Texas